The Princess of Wales Theatre is a 2,000-seat live theatre in Toronto, Ontario, Canada. It is located on King Street West, in Toronto's downtown Entertainment District. The theatre's name has a triple meaning: it honours Diana, Princess of Wales, with whose consent the theatre was named; it links the building to its sister theatre, the Royal Alexandra, one block to the east, also named – with Royal assent – for a former Princess of Wales; and it recalls the Princess Theatre, Toronto's first "first-class legitimate" playhouse, that stood three blocks to the east until 1931.

History
Ed and David Mirvish built the theatre as a state-of-the-art facility to stage large-scale musicals for long runs.  The family's Mirvish Productions owns Toronto's Royal Alexandra, Ed Mirvish (formerly the Canon), and CAA (formerly the Panasonic) theatres. The Mirvish family owned the former Honest Ed's discount store and the Mirvish Village retail district, which are currently being redeveloped.

Construction began on August 6, 1991. The project architect was Peter Smith, of the Toronto firm Lett-Smith. Smith was also responsible for the duMaurier Theatre Centre in Toronto and for the restoration of the Grand Theatre, in London, Ontario.

For the Princess of Wales Theatre, David Mirvish commissioned a series of murals by American abstract expressionist painter and sculptor Frank Stella. The paintings——cover the auditorium ceiling dome, the proscenium arch, the walls of lounges and lobbies on all four levels of the theatre and the outside back wall of the fly tower. They are believed to comprise one of the largest mural installations of modern times. Stella also designed the decorative fronts of the boxes and balconies and the decorative end-caps of the each seating row. The theatre has seating on three levels—orchestra, dress circle and balcony—with elevator access to all levels and is configured as a traditional 19th century English proscenium theatre. Further, the entire theatre is barrier-free, enabling wheelchair access to all levels — not a common occurrence in Toronto considering the age of many of its theatres. The Princess of Wales Theatre is designed to incorporate both traditional and contemporary design elements.

The theatre opened on May 26, 1993, with a Canadian production of the megamusical Miss Saigon. Subsequent productions in the Princess of Wales have included the musicals Beauty and the Beast, The Lion King, Les Misérables, Hairspray, Chicago, Oliver!, Cabaret, The Phantom of the Opera, The Sound of Music, and Joseph and the Amazing Technicolor Dreamcoat.

A stage production of The Lord of the Rings made its world premiere in the facilities on February 8, 2006, losing money owing to terrible reviews and a lack of public interest. The original stage was gutted and replaced with a complex stage surface that includes three interlocking turntables and 17 independent elevators for this production.

The National Theatre's production of War Horse opened at the theatre on February 10, 2012.

On September 29, 2012, after operating for only 19 years, Mirvish Productions announced a plan to demolish the Princess of Wales Theatre in favour of a multi-purpose complex designed by Frank Gehry and which would include an extensive artwork collection available for public viewing, as well as museums, condominium units, and retail spaces. However, in response to criticism from city planners, Mirvish and Gehry announced a revised plan in May 2014 which would spare the structure.

Notable productions
Productions are listed by the year of their first performance.

1993: Miss Saigon
1995:  Beauty and the Beast
1997: The Importance of Being Earnest, Buddy: The Buddy Holly Story
1998: Slava's Snowshow,  Chicago
1999: The Pajama Game,  Fame,  Les Misérables,  Cabaret, Oliver!
2000:  The Lion King
2004:  The Hollow Crown,  Hairspray
2005: Da Kink in My Hair,  Evita,  Les Misérables
2006:  Lord of the Rings
2007:  The Phantom of the Opera,  Sweeney Todd
2008: Twelve Angry Men, The Life and Adventures of Nicholas Nickleby, The Sound of Music
2010:  Young Frankenstein,  Mamma Mia!,  Legally Blonde,  Priscilla, Queen of the Desert
2011:  The Lion King,  Hugh Jackman in Concert,  Chess,  Mary Poppins
2012:  War Horse
2013:  The Book of Mormon, Anything Goes,  Les Misérables
2014:  The Lion King,  The Book of Mormon
2015:  Blithe Spirit,  Titanic, Motown: The Musical,  The Phantom of the Opera
2016: If/Then, A Gentleman's Guide to Love and Murder, Cuisine & Confessions
2017:  The Book of Mormon,  Strictly Ballroom,  The Curious Incident of the Dog in the Night-Time, The Illusionists
2018:  An American in Paris, The King and I, Ain't Too Proud,  Charlie and the Chocolate Factory
2019:  The Last Ship, Beautiful: The Carole King Musical,  The Lion King,  Cats
2021: Blindness, Jesus Christ Superstar
2022:  Room, & Juliet, Singin' in the Rain, Mean Girls, Joseph and the Amazing Technicolor Dreamcoat

See also
 Massey Hall
 Roy Thomson Hall
 Meridian Hall (Toronto)
 Royal eponyms in Canada

References

External links
 

Theatres in Toronto
Diana, Princess of Wales
Mirvish family
Theatres completed in 1993
1993 establishments in Ontario